Di Giorgio may refer to:
Di Giorgio, California
DiGiorgio Corporation

People 
Anthony DiGiorgio (1940–2020), American academics administrator
Francesco di Giorgio (1439–1502), Sienese sculptor
Frank Di Giorgio, Canadian politician
Marosa di Giorgio (1932–2004), Uruguayan writer
Massimo Di Giorgio (born 1958), Italian high jumper
Vito Di Giorgio (1880–1922), crime boss

Italian-language surnames
Patronymic surnames
Surnames from given names